Trainee Day (original title: Maman a tort) is a 2016 French-Belgian comedy-drama film written and directed by Marc Fitoussi. It stars Émilie Dequenne and Jeanne Jestin.

Plot 
A 14-year-old discovers a different side of her mother and the workings of the corporate world when she interns at her mother's insurance workplace.

Cast 
 Jeanne Jestin as Anouk
 Émilie Dequenne as Cyrielle
 Nelly Antignac as Bénédicte
 Camille Chamoux as Mathilde
 Annie Grégorio as Simone
 Sabrina Ouazani as Nadia Choukri
 Jean-François Cayrey as Blanchard
 Grégoire Ludig as The father
 Joshua Mazé as Émile
 Stéphane Bissot as Perrine
 Laetitia Spigarelli as Constance
 Lucie Fagedet as Clarisse
 Louise Coldefy as airport restaurant server

References

External links 
 

2016 films
2016 comedy-drama films
2010s French-language films
French comedy-drama films
Films directed by Marc Fitoussi
Belgian comedy-drama films
French-language Belgian films
2010s French films